Samuel Johnston or Sam Johnston  may refer to:
 Sam Johnston (Yukon politician) (born 1935), politician in the Yukon, Canada
 Sam Johnston (wrestler) (born 1987), American professional wrestler better known as Sami Callihan
 Sammy Johnston (born 1967), Scottish footballer
 Samuel Johnston (1733–1816), American lawyer and statesman
 Samuel Johnston (footballer) (1866–1910), Irish footballer
 Samuel Johnston (Waterview) (died 1924), Australian pioneer

See also
 Samuel Johnson (disambiguation)